Louder Than Life is a rock and metal event that takes place in Louisville, Kentucky, United States.  The event is known to also feature whiskey, craft beer, gourmet food and multiple exhibits. It has made a large economic impact on the city of Louisville.

History
The first Louder Than Life was a two-day festival hosted at Champions Park in 2014 

The 2015 festival also featured live matches between wrestlers from WWE NXT. 

In 2018 the festival was cancelled due to continuing rain and deteriorating conditions at Champions Park. 

The festival was expanded to three days in 2019 and moved to the Kentucky Exposition Center to prevent flooding.

The 2020 festival was cancelled due to the COVID-19 pandemic. 

In 2021 the festival was expanded to four days.

Estimated yearly attendance
 2014: 36,000
 2015: 50,000
 2016: 50,000
 2017: 60,000
 2019: 128,000
 2021: 160,000
 2022: 170,000

Lineups

2014

Saturday, October 4
 Judas Priest
 Korn
 Stone Temple Pilots with Chester Bennington
 Limp Bizkit
 Alter Bridge
 Mastodon
 Theory of a Deadman
 Of Mice and Men
 Steel Panther
 Memphis May Fire
 Pop Evil
 Fuel
 Otherwise
 Thousand Foot Krutch
 Nonpoint
 Wilson
 Flaw

Sunday, October 5
 Kid Rock
 Papa Roach
 Five Finger Death Punch
 Volbeat
 A Day to Remember
 Bring Me the Horizon
 Buckcherry
 In This Moment
 Hellyeah
 Chiodos
 Motionless in White
 Nothing More
 Butcher Babies
 Crobot
 Avatar
  Monster Truck
 Islander

2015

Saturday, October 3
 Rob Zombie
 Godsmack
 Chevelle
 Seether
 Sevendust
 Tremonti
 Bring Me the Horizon
 Of Mice and Men
 Hollywood Undead
 Atreyu
 Issues
 10 Years
 Butcher Babies
 Starset
 Beartooth
 Art of Dying
 Turbowolf
 Dorothy
 Jelly Roll
 Cliver
 Romantic Rebel
 RavenEye

Sunday, October 4
 ZZ Top
 Lynyrd Skynyrd
 Slash featuring Myles Kennedy and the Conspirators
 Breaking Benjamin
 Shinedown
 3 Doors Down
 Collective Soul
 Hinder
 Saint Asonia
 Black Stone Cherry
 Skid Row
 Kentucky Headhunters
 We Came as Romans
 Nothing More
 We Are Harlot
 Aranda
 Like a Storm
 The Temperance Movement
 The Glorious Sons
 Kill It Kid
 Marmozets
 Red Sun Rising
 All Them Witches
 Whiskey Myers
 Goodbye June

2016

Saturday, October 1
 Avenged Sevenfold
 Slayer
 The Cult
 I Prevail
 Pierce the Veil
 Cheap Trick
 Anthrax
 Hellyeah
 Chevy Metal
 Motionless in White
 The Amity Affliction
 Avatar
 Sick Puppies
 Neck Deep
 Young Guns
 Being As An Ocean
 '68
 Twelve Foot Ninja
 Dinosaur Pile-Up

Sunday, October 2
 Slipknot
 Disturbed
 Korn
 Alter Bridge
 Ghost
 Clutch
 Sevendust
 Pop Evil
 Biffy Clyro
 Parkway Drive
 Skillet
 Trivium
 Zakk Sabbath(Black Sabbath cover band with Zakk Wylde)
 Kyng
 Skindred
 Adelitas Way
 Crobot
 Sabaton
 Smashing Satellites

2017

Saturday, September 30
 Ozzy Osbourne featuring Zakk Wylde
 Rob Zombie
 Hollywood Undead
 Five Finger Death Punch
 Halestorm
 For We Are Many
 Of Mice and Men
 Sleeping with Sirens
  Mastodon
 Gojira
 Eagles of Death Metal
 Starset
 New Years Day
 Palisades
 Steel Panther
 Fire From the Gods
 Through Fire
 He Is Legend
 Ded

Sunday, October 1
 Prophets of Rage
 Rise Against
 Incubus
 Stone Sour
 Falling in Reverse
 Beartooth
 Joyous Wolf
 Nothing More
 The Pretty Reckless
 Greta Van Fleet
 Black Map
 In This Moment
 Lacuna Coil
 Radkey
 Ocean Grove
 '68
 Biters

2019

Friday, September 27 
 Gwar
 Slipknot
 Staind
 A Day to Remember
 Chevelle
 I Prevail
 Architects
 Beartooth
 Motionless In White
 Phil Anselmo(performing with his band Philip H. Anselmo & the Illegals).
 Wilson
 The Crystal Method
 Graveyard
 Frank Carter and the Rattlesnakes
 New Years Day
 All Them Witches
 Crown Lands
 Joyous Wolf
 Dead Posey
 Santa Cruz

Saturday, September 28
 Guns N' Roses
 Ice Cube
 Godsmack
 Stone Temple Pilots
 Suicidal Tendencies
 Halestorm
 Dropkick Murphys
 Melvins
 Andrew W.K.
 Badflower
 Knocked Loose
 Anti-Flag
 Redd Kross
 Parlor Mob
 Like A Storm
 Jelly Roll
 Dirty Honey
 Ded
 Junkbunny
 The Pink Slips

Sunday, September 29
 Rob Zombie
 Marilyn Manson
 Disturbed
 Breaking Benjamin
 Sum 41
 Three Days Grace
 Die Antwoord
 In This Moment
 Deadland Ritual
 White Reaper
 Demon Hunter
 Ho99o9
 Angel Dust
 Sick Puppies
 Amigo the Devil
 Fire From the Gods
 Broken Hands
 Anemic Royalty

2021
Breaking Benjamin were added on September 21, 2021, as replacements for Mudvayne, who cancelled their performance due to Chad Gray and some staff members contracting COVID-19. Disturbed replaced Nine Inch Nails for the Saturday headliner spot.

Thursday, September 23
 Korn
 Staind
 Cypress Hill
 Anthrax
 Beartooth
 Sevendust
 Knocked Loose
 Wage War
 Memphis May Fire
 Escape the Fate
 Zero 9:36
 Avoid
 Currents
 Jeris Johnson
 Another Day Dawns
 Blame My Youth

Friday, September 24
 Metallica
 Jane's Addiction
 Rise Against
 Gojira
 Killswitch Engage
 Starset
 Avatar
 Fever 333
 Turnstile
 Cleopatrick
 Dead Sara
 '68
 The Violent
 South of Eden
 Tallah
 Joyous Wolf
 Contracult Collective

Saturday, September 25
 Disturbed
 Machine Gun Kelly
 Volbeat
 Falling in Reverse
 Suicidal Tendencies
 Asking Alexandria
 Atreyu
 Grandson
 Code Orange
 Ice Nine Kills
 Spiritbox
 Red
 Butcher Babies
 Bones UK
 Diamante
 Siiickbrain
 Unitytx
 Dana Dentata
 The Messenger Birds

Sunday, September 26
 Metallica
 Judas Priest
 Breaking Benjamin
 Seether
 Pennywise
 Skillet
 Sabaton
 The Hu
 Badflower
 Tremonti
 Fozzy
 Every Time I Die
 Ayron Jones
 From Ashes to New
 Teenage Wrist
 Dead Poet Society
 Like Machines

2022

Thursday, September 22
Nine Inch Nails
Bring Me the Horizon
Evanescence
Halestorm
Tenacious D
Yungblud
Highly Suspect
Ministry
Nothing More
Spiritbox
Apocalyptica
Ho99o9
New Years Day
Lilith Czar
Dorothy
Plush
Maggie Lindemann
Taipei Houston
Royal & the Serpent
Giovannie and the Hired Guns
The Dead Deads
Mothica
Superbloom
Eva Under Fire
Archers
Nail Bite
Asava
Two Sides of Me
Magg Dylan

Friday, September 23
Slipknot
Shinedown
Lamb of God
Mastodon
In This Moment
Meshuggah
Clutch
Gwar
In Flames
Baroness
Helmet
Crown the Empire
Poorstacy
Amigo the Devil
Ded
All Good Things
Vended
Mike's Dead
Suicide Silence
Orbit Culture
The Luka State
Ego Kill Talent
Aeir
Archetypes Collide
Until I Wake
Befell
Young Other
The Dev
The 500 Block
Thirst

Saturday, September 24
Kiss
Rob Zombie
Alice Cooper
Chevelle
Ghostemane
Jerry Cantrell
Body Count
Theory of a Deadman
Sevendust
Pop Evil
We Came as Romans
Airbourne
Cherry Bombs
Ill Nino
Tetrarch
D.R.U.G.S.
Redlight King
Wargasm
Trash Boat
The Alive
Solence
Dropout Kings
Bloodywood
Widow7
Scarlet O'hara
Silly Goose
Sevven
Breed

Sunday, September 25
Red Hot Chili Peppers
Alice in Chains
Incubus
Papa Roach
The Pretty Reckless
Bad Religion
Action Bronson
Jelly Roll
The Struts
Dirty Honey
Anti-Flag
The Joy Formidable
Bayside
Oxymorrons
Carolesdaughter
The Warning
Radkey
The Native Howl
Shaman's Harvest
Joey Valence & Brae
Lines of Loyalty
Heartsick
Normundy
As You Were
The Strangers

References

External links
 Official website

Heavy metal festivals in the United States
Music of Louisville, Kentucky
Rock festivals in the United States
2014 establishments in Kentucky